Civ or CIV may refer to:

Arts and entertainment
 CIV (band), a punk rock music band
 Civ (imprint), an imprint of VDM Publishing devoted to the reproduction of Wikipedia content
 Civilization (1980 board game)
 Civilization (series) or Civ, a series of computer games

Physics
 Corona inception voltage, see corona discharge
 Critical ionization velocity, a plasma phenomenon in physics

Other uses
 Civ., an abbreviation for 'civil'
 Civilian
 104 (number), or CIV in Roman numerals
 CIV (rail travel), International Convention for the transportation of Passengers (French: Convention Internationale pour le transport des Voyageurs)
 "Caritas in Veritate", Pope Benedict XVI's social encyclical
 City of London Imperial Volunteers, a British corps of volunteers during the Second Boer War
 Ivory Coast (officially Côte d'Ivoire), a country in West Africa

See also

 C4 (disambiguation) -- i.e. C-IV
 Civilization (disambiguation)